The Fujifilm FinePix S9200 bridge camera is made by Fujifilm on january 6, 2014.

Reviews 
Initial reviews on the S9200 have been favourable, with users citing the 50x zoom lens as one of the camera's key benefits.

This view was also echoed by a wildlife and PhotographyBlog who tried the camera out in the field.

Notes and references 
 http://www.dpreview.com/products/fujifilm/compacts/fujifilm_s9200/specifications

S9200